The 2015 Michigan Wolverines football team represented the University of Michigan in the sport of college football during the 2015 NCAA Division I FBS football season. The Wolverines competed in the East Division of the Big Ten Conference, and played their home games at Michigan Stadium in Ann Arbor, Michigan. Michigan was led by head coach Jim Harbaugh, who was in his first season.

Michigan's first game under Harbaugh was a road game against Utah, which the Wolverines lost 17–24. The team won their three remaining non-conference games in dominant fashion, including a 31–0 victory over then-No. 22 BYU, which was just Michigan's second victory over a ranked opponent in their previous 11 tries. This was the first season since 2002 in which Michigan didn't play Notre Dame either home or away.  That game was the first in a series of three straight shutout victories, including a 38–0 victory over then-No. 13 Northwestern, the first three-game shutout streak for Michigan since 1980. Michigan rose to 12th in the polls, but fell to in-state rival Michigan State 23–27 after the Spartans returned a muffed punt for a touchdown on the last play of the game. The Wolverines won their remaining Big Ten games before a blow-out loss to rival Ohio State to end the regular season 6–2 in Big Ten play, to finish in third place in the East Division. Michigan was invited to the Citrus Bowl, where they defeated Florida, 41–7, to finish the year with a record of 10–3, and were ranked 12th in the final AP Poll.  It was Michigan's first 10-win season since 2011. The team was the first Michigan team to go undefeated on the road in conference play since the national champion 1997 Michigan Wolverines football team.

Offensively, Michigan was led by quarterback Jake Rudock, a transfer from Iowa, who led the Big Ten in pass completion percentage (64%), and was the first Michigan quarterback to eclipse 3,000 yards passing since John Navarre in 2003. Tight end Jake Butt received the Kwalick-Clark Award as the Big Ten's tight end of the year. On defense, linebacker Jabrill Peppers was named Big Ten Freshman of the Year and was joined on the All-Big Ten first team by cornerback Jourdan Lewis.

Preseason
In 2014, Michigan compiled a 5–7 record and was not bowl eligible for the first time since 2009. As a result of the team's poor record, head coach Brady Hoke was fired on December 2. His job status had been in jeopardy since September 28, 2014 when QB Shane Morris was reinserted after a concussion. On December 30, following a much publicized coaching search, Michigan announced the hiring of San Francisco 49ers coach and former Michigan quarterback Jim Harbaugh as the 20th head coach in the program's history. Harbaugh hired D. J. Durkin for the defensive coordinator and linebacker coach positions and Tim Drevno for the offensive coordinator and offensive line coach positions. In addition to the co-ordinator positions, Harbaugh also hired John Baxter to coach special teams, former Jacksonville Jaguars offensive coordinator Jedd Fisch as the passing game coordinator and wide receivers coach, Jim Harbaugh's son Jay as the tight ends coach, Greg Jackson and Mike Zordich as the secondary coaches, Kevin Tolbert as the strength and conditioning coach, and former running back Tyrone Wheatley—who won a Rose Bowl while playing at Michigan—to coach the running backs. Michigan also retained Greg Mattison from Hoke's staff as the defensive line coach.

Recruiting

Position key

Recruits
Michigan's recruiting class consisted of a total of 14 recruits.

Rankings

Schedule

Radio
Radio coverage for all games was broadcast statewide on The Michigan IMG Sports Network and on Sirius XM Satellite Radio. The radio announcers were Jim Brandstatter with play-by-play, Dan Dierdorf with color commentary, and Doug Karsch with sideline reports.

Game summaries

at Utah

Sources:

    
    
    
    
    
    

To open the season, Michigan faced the Utah Utes. Utah dominated the previous meeting, winning 26–10 in a game that featured an almost two-and-a-half hour weather delay. After a starting quarterback was not named during the team's preseason, Michigan chose to start graduate transfer Jake Rudock over the returning junior Shane Morris.

Utah defeated Michigan, 24–17. Utah opened the scoring in the first quarter via a 30-yard field goal from Andy Phillips. Michigan responded in the second quarter with a 29-yard field goal from Kenny Allen, but Utah regained the lead via a one-yard touchdown run from Devontae Booker and went into half-time leading 10–3. Utah extended its lead in the third quarter to 14 points via a 14-yard touchdown run from Travis Wilson, but Michigan responded with a 19-yard touchdown pass from Jake Rudock to Jake Butt. Utah regained its 14-point advantage in the fourth quarter when Justin Thomas intercepted Rudock and returned it 55 yards for a touchdown, but Michigan once again reduced Utah's lead to seven points with a ten-yard touchdown pass from Rudock to Amara Darboh. Utah recovered the ensuing onside kick and ran out the clock to complete its victory.

Jake Rudock completed 27 of his 43 pass attempts for 279 yards and two touchdowns and three interceptions. De'Veon Smith ran 17 times for 47 yards, while Jake Butt recorded eight receptions for 93 yards and a touchdown. Joe Bolden recorded his 200th career tackle during the game, and Michigan's defense as a whole recorded nine tackles for a loss. The announced attendance of 47,825 was the largest crowd in the history of Rice-Eccles Stadium.

vs. Oregon State

Sources:

    
    
    
    
    
    

Following its game against Utah, Michigan hosted Oregon State for its home opener. This was the first meeting between the two schools since 1986, when Michigan defeated Oregon State 31–12 as Jim Harbaugh (then Michigan's quarterback) accounted for three touchdowns: two passing and one rushing.

After falling behind early in the first quarter, Michigan rallied to defeat Oregon State 35–7. Oregon State opened the scoring on its first drive of the game, moving the ball 79 yards in seven plays and scoring on a 21-yard touchdown pass from Seth Collins to Hunter Jarmon. Following Oregon State's touchdown, Michigan dominated the game on both offense and defense. After the teams traded fumbles in the first quarter, Michigan reduced Oregon State's lead to four points via a 40-yard field goal from Kenny Allen, and took the lead in the second quarter via a one-yard touchdown run from De'Veon Smith. Michigan added to its lead shortly before halftime with another one-yard touchdown run from Smith, giving it a 17–7 at half-time. Michigan added a 29-yard field goal in the third quarter, before finishing the scoring in the fourth quarter with an eight-yard touchdown run from Smith—and a two-point conversion pass from Rudock to Smith—and a two-yard touchdown run from Derrick Green.

Michigan dominated Oregon State in all statistical categories, out-gaining the Beavers 405–138 in yardage. Michigan rushed for 225 yards on 48 attempts, while Oregon State only managed 59 yards on 33 attempts. Oregon State only converted one first down out of 13 attempts on either third or fourth down. Oregon State gained 136 of its 138 yards of offense in the first quarter, before being shut down by the Wolverines defense and only gaining two total yards in the final three quarters. Inc contrast, Michigan gained 357 yards during the final three quarters. Smith rushed for 126 yards and three touchdowns, both career highs. The win was Jim Harbaugh's first win as coach at Michigan, while Michigan improved its record in home openers to 113–18–2.

vs. UNLV

Sources:

    
    
    
    

Following the game against Oregon State, Michigan hosted the University of Nevada, Las Vegas (UNLV) Rebels. This was the first ever meeting between the two programs.

Michigan defeated UNLV, 28–7. Michigan opened the scoring in the first quarter with a five-yard touchdown pass from Jake Rudock to De'Veon Smith and added to its lead in the second quarter with a 36-yard touchdown run from Jehu Chesson and a 76-yard touchdown run from Ty Isaac. After neither team scored in the third quarter, Michigan added to its lead with a one-yard touchdown run from Sione Houma. UNLV responded with a six-yard touchdown pass from Blake Decker to Devonte Boyd, which ended the scoring.

Isaac's 76-yard touchdown run was Michigan's longest since Denard Robinson went for 79 yards against Air Force in 2012 and the longest by a Wolverine running back since Carlos Brown went 90 yards against Eastern Michigan in 2009. The run was also his career long. Houma and Chesson both recorded the first rushing touchdowns of their respective careers. The attendance of over 100,000 was Michigan's 260th consecutive game of over 100,000 in attendance. Michigan's defense held UNLV to only 92 yards of rushing offense.

vs. BYU

Sources:

    
    
    
    

Following its game against UNLV, Michigan faced the Brigham Young (BYU) Cougars. This was the first meeting between the schools since the 1984 Holiday Bowl, which saw BYU defeat Michigan to clinch that season's national championship.

Michigan defeated BYU, 31–0. Michigan opened the scoring in the first quarter with a three-yard touchdown run from Jake Rudock and then scored 24 points in the second quarter. Rudock completed a four-yard touchdown pass to Amara Darboh, followed by a 60-yard touchdown run from De'Veon Smith. Rudock added his second rushing touchdown of the game on a 17-yard run, and Kenny Allen added the final points of the game on a 40-yard field goal near the end of the first half. Neither team added any points in the second half.

The win over BYU marked Michigan's first win over a ranked opponent since defeating Notre Dame 41–30 on September 7, 2013, and it was its first shutout against a ranked opponent since defeating Notre Dame 38–0 on September 13, 2003. It was Michigan's first shutout since Illinois in 2012, and the first time BYU had been shut out since a game against Utah in 2003. Michigan's defense held BYU's offense to only 105 yards of total offense. The 55 yards of rushing offense was BYU's lowest total since another Utah game (in 2011) when it only rushed for 11 yards.

at Maryland

Sources:

    
    
    
    

After its game against BYU, Michigan began the Big Ten portion of its schedule at Maryland. Maryland won the previous meeting 23–16. The game's original kickoff time of 8:00 PM was moved forward by eight hours to noon in order to avoid the potential impact of Hurricane Joaquin.

Michigan defeated Maryland, 28–0. After neither team scored in the first quarter, Michigan opened the scoring in the second quarter with a 30-yard field goal by Kenny Allen. Michigan added to its lead with a 32-yard field goal from Allen near the end of the first half, giving Michigan a 6–0 lead at half-time. Michigan added to its lead in the third quarter with a 31-yard touchdown pass from Jake Rudock to Drake Johnson, and then added a two-point conversion via a Rudock pass to Khalid Hill. Michigan added to its lead with a 66-yard touchdown run from Jehu Chesson before Johnson added the final points of the game in the fourth quarter via a one-yard touchdown run, his second of the game.

The win marked Michigan's first consecutive shutouts since 2000, when Michigan shut out Indiana after shutting out Michigan State the previous week. Michigan's defense forced 12 three-and-outs, and had, as of the end of the game, shut out opponents in 14 of the last 16 quarters it had played. Blake O'Neill placed a punt within the opponent's five yard line for the fourth time in five games. Jourdan Lewis and Desmond Morgan recorded their first interceptions of the season, while Jeremy Clark recorded his third of the year.

vs. Northwestern

Sources:

    
    
    
    
   

Following its game against Maryland, Michigan hosted the Northwestern Wildcats for its homecoming game. Michigan won the previous meeting 10–9 in a turnover filled game by stopping Northwestern's attempted go-ahead two-point conversion with three seconds remaining in the game.

Michigan posted its third consecutive shutout, defeating Northwestern 38–0. Michigan opened the scoring on the first play of the game with a 96-yard opening kickoff return for a touchdown by Jehu Chesson. Michigan added to its lead with a one-yard touchdown run from Drake Johnson, and a two-yard touchdown run from Jake Rudock, giving Michigan a 21–0 lead after the first quarter. In the second quarter Jourdan Lewis posted a 37-yard interception return for a touchdown, which made the score 28–0 in favor of Michigan at half-time. Michigan added to its lead in the third quarter via a career-long 47-yard field goal by Kenny Allen, before Derrick Green added the final points of the game in the fourth quarter via a four-yard touchdown run.

The win marked Michigan's third consecutive shutout, a feat not accomplished by any Football Bowl Subdivision team since Kansas State in 1995. It was also the first time a Michigan team had recorded three consecutive shutouts since 1980, when Michigan shut out Indiana, Wisconsin and Purdue. Michigan has outscored its opposition, 97–0, over its last three games, and not allowed a point over 41 straight defensive possessions. The Wolverines scored at least one touchdown on offense, defense and special teams in the same game for the first time since 2003. Chesson's opening kickoff return for a touchdown was the 11th kick return for a touchdown in program history, and the first opening kickoff return for a touchdown since 1992, when Tyrone Wheatley returned the opening kickoff against Houston.

vs. Michigan State

Sources:

    
    
    
    
    
    
    
    

Following its clash with Northwestern, Michigan hosted its in-state rival, the Michigan State Spartans, for the Paul Bunyan Trophy. Michigan was dominated in the previous meeting, losing 35–11. Due to the quality of and the hype surrounding the matchup between the two teams, the game was selected as the location for ESPN's College GameDay. This was the first time that GameDay came to Ann Arbor since Michigan defeated Notre Dame in 2013.

Michigan State defeated Michigan 27–23. Michigan opened the scoring in the second quarter with a two-yard touchdown run from Sione Houma, Michigan State responded with an 11-yard touchdown run from LJ Scott. A 38-yard field goal by Kenny Allen gave Michigan a 10–7 lead at half-time. Michigan added to its lead in the third quarter with a one-yard touchdown run from Houma, his second rushing touchdown of the game. Michigan State responded via a 30-yard touchdown pass from Connor Cook to Macgarrett Kings Jr. A 21-yard field goal by Allen in the final minutes of the third gave Michigan a 20–14 lead after the third quarter. Michigan added to its lead in the fourth quarter with a 38-yard field goal by Allen, but Michigan State responded with a one-yard touchdown run from Scott, his second rushing touchdown of the game, to cut Michigan's lead to two points. With 10 seconds left in the game, Michigan punter Blake O'Neill had trouble with the snap and the ball was free. It was picked up by Michigan State's Jalen Watts-Jackson, and he scored on the last play of the game. Michigan State became the second team in the last two seasons to win a game in regulation in which it did not have the lead until the clock hit 0:00. Last season, Arizona beat California on a game-ending Hail Mary after not having the lead the entire game.

Michigan's defensive streaks of 13 straight shutout quarters and 46 consecutive scoreless drives ended when Michigan State scored a touchdown with 7:06 left in the second quarter. Jourdan Lewis matched a program record with six pass breakups, tying Marlin Jackson, who accomplished the feat against the Washington on August 31, 2002. He owns a total of 14 pass breakups on the season, placing him tied for fourth among Michigan's single-season leaders in the category. Blake O'Neill's 80-yard punt is the longest punt by any FBS punter so far this season and the second longest in Michigan program history, trailing only Monte Robbins' 82-yard punt at Hawaii on December 6, 1986.

at Minnesota

Sources:

    
    
    
    
    
    
    
    
    

After its game against Michigan State and a bye week, Michigan traveled to Minneapolis to face the Minnesota Golden Gophers for the Little Brown Jug. In the previous meeting, Minnesota dominated Michigan, winning 30–14.

Michigan defeated Minnesota, 29–26. Minnesota opened the scoring in the first quarter with a 23-yard field goal from Ryan Santoso. Michigan responded with 14 straight points via a one-yard touchdown run from Joe Kerridge near the end of the first quarter and a 13-yard touchdown pass from Jake Rudock to Jehu Chesson. Minnesota responded with 13 unanswered points of its own via a 30-yard field goal from Santoso, a 52-yard touchdown pass from Mitch Leidner to Rashad Still, and a 32-yard field goal from Santoso, which made the score 16–14 in favor of Minnesota at half-time. Michigan regained the lead in the third quarter when Jabrill Peppers scored his first career offensive touchdown with a five-yard rush, but Minnesota regained the lead with a 24-yard touchdown run from Leidner. Minnesota extended its lead in the fourth quarter with a 47-yard field goal from Santoso, but Michigan regained the lead with a 12-yard touchdown pass from Wilton Speight—who had replaced an injured Rudock at quarterback earlier in the half—to Jehu Chesson. Speight then completed a two-point conversion attempt with a pass to Amara Darboh, giving Michigan a three-point lead. Minnesota drove to Michigan's one-yard line on its ensuing possession, but Michigan's defense stopped both Golden Gopher attempts from the one-yard line and held on for the win as time expired.

The Michigan defense has surrendered 11 total red-zone possessions to opposing offenses. Those 11 possessions have amounted to just five touchdowns and four field goals, including three field goals in three trips by Minnesota. Jourdan Lewis had one pass breakup to give him 17 on the season, trailing the all-time single-season record held by Marlin Jackson (2002) and Leon Hall (2006) by one.

vs. Rutgers

Sources:

    
    
    
    
    
    
    
    
    
    
    

After facing Minnesota, Michigan hosted Rutgers. Rutgers won the previous meeting by a score of 26–24.

Michigan defeated Rutgers 49–16. Michigan opened the scoring in the first quarter via a 13-yard touchdown pass from Jake Ruddock to Jehu Chesson. Rutgers responded with a 32-yard field goal by Kyle Federico, but Michigan added to its lead with 14 unanswered points: seven in the first  via a four-yard touchdown run from Jake Ruddock, and seven in the second quarter via an 18-yard touchdown run from Jabrill Peppers. Rutgers responded with a 98-yard kickoff return by Janarion Grant, to cut Michigan's lead to 21–10. Michigan added to its lead via a 1-yard touchdown run from Drake Johnson, but Rutgers responded with a 29-yard field by Kyle Federico. Michigan added to its lead via an eight-yard touchdown pass from Jake Ruddock to Amara Darboh, but Rutgers responded with a 27-yard field goal to end the first half, which made the score 35–16 in favor of Michigan at half-time. Michigan held Rutgers scoreless during the second half and added to its lead with 14 unanswered points via a 4-yard touchdown run from De'Veon Smith and a two-point conversion run by Jake Ruddock, a 34-yard field goal by Kenny Allen, and a 28-yard field goal by Allen in the fourth quarter.

With his 18th and 19th pass breakups of the season, Jourdan Lewis claimed sole ownership of the single-season Michigan record, which had previously been shared by Leon Hall and Marlin Jackson. Michigan has allowed just 16 red-zone possessions to opponents all season long, the fewest in FBS, allowing points on 15 of those drives, including just six touchdowns allowed. Jake Rudock passed for 337 yards, a career best and his first 300-yard performance at Michigan. Rudock's yardage was the 12th-highest single-game total in Michigan history.

at Indiana

Sources:

    
    
    
    
    
    
    
    
    
    
    
    
    
    
    

After hosting Rutgers, Michigan traveled to Bloomington, Indiana to face the Indiana Hoosiers. Michigan dominated the previous meeting, winning 34–10.

Michigan survived an upset bid from Indiana, defeating the Hoosiers 48–41 in double overtime. Michigan opened the scoring in the first quarter with a 34-yard touchdown pass from Jake Rudock to Jehu Chesson, which became a routine connection for Michigan touchdowns in the game. Indiana responded with two field goals in the first quarter from Griffin Oakes: one from 39 yards and one from 36 yards. Michigan extended its lead to eight points in the second quarter with a 15-yard touchdown pass from Rudock to Chesson, but Indiana reduced Michigan's lead to five with a 51-yard field goal from Oakes. Michigan responded under a minute later with a 64-yard touchdown pass from Rudock to Chesson, extending its lead to 12, but Indiana responded with a seven-yard touchdown pass from Nate Sudfeld to Jordan Howard. Michigan added a 22-yard field goal from Kenny Allen as time expired in the first half, making the score 24–16 in favor of Michigan at half-time. Indiana reduced Michigan's lead to one point in the third quarter with a 51-yard punt return for a touchdown from Mitchell Paige, and then took its first lead of the game with a 24-yard field goal from Oakes. Michigan regained the lead in the fourth quarter with a 20-yard field goal from Allen, but Indiana responded with a 24-yard touchdown run from Howard. Howard also converted Indiana's two-point conversion attempt, giving Indiana a seven-point lead with just under three minutes remaining in the game. Michigan responded by driving down the field and tying the game with two seconds left on a five-yard touchdown pass from Rudock to Chesson, Chesson's fourth touchdown reception of the game. The teams traded touchdowns in the first overtime, with Howard rushing for a one-yard touchdown for Indiana and Jake Butt catching a 21-yard touchdown pass from Rudock. Michigan took the lead in the second overtime via a 25-yard touchdown pass from Rudock to Amara Darboh, and then managed to stop Indiana on a fourth-and-goal attempt from the two-yard line to win the game.

The victory against Indiana was Michigan's 20th consecutive victory against the Hoosiers. Michigan set a new season high in offense, totaling 581 yards during the game. Rudock's six touchdown passes set a new school record, surpassing the previous record of four. Rudock threw for over 300-yards in the second consecutive game, becoming the first Michigan quarterback to do so since Chad Henne in 2004. Rudock passed for 440 yards, setting a new career high for the second week in a row. Rudock's yardage was the third-highest single-game total in Michigan history. Rudock's 33 completions are tied for the second most in a game in Michigan history. Chesson's four touchdown receptions tied the school record, which was set by Derrick Alexander in 1992. Chesson set single-game career highs in receptions (10), receiving yards (207), and touchdowns (4). Chesson's four touchdown receptions marked the 14th time in Michigan history that a wide receiver recorded at least three touchdowns in one game, and the first time since Devin Funchess last season. Michigan's defense allowed a season-high 527 yards of offense during the game. Jourdan Lewis extended his record of pass break ups during the season to 20 in total, and leads the nation in pass breakups per game (2.0).

at Penn State

Sources:

    
    
    
    
    
    
    

Following its game against Indiana, Michigan played its final road game against Penn State. Michigan won the previous meeting by a score of 18–13.

Michigan defeated Penn State, 28–16. Penn State opened the scoring in the first quarter with a 23-yard field goal from Tyler Davis, but Michigan took the lead with a 26-yard touchdown pass from Jake Rudock to Jake Butt. Penn State regained the lead in the second quarter with a 25-yard touchdown pass from Christian Hackenberg to Saeed Blacknail, but Michigan responded with an 11-yard touchdown pass from Rudock to Amara Darboh, which made the score 14–10 in favor of Michigan at half-time. Michigan added the only score in the third quarter with a one-yard touchdown run from Sione Houma, which extended Michigan's lead to 11 points. Penn State reduced Michigan's lead to five points in the fourth quarter with two field goals from Davis, one from 24-yards, and one from 18-yards. Michigan added the final points of the game in the fourth quarter via a one-yard touchdown run from De'Veon Smith.

Michigan won at Beaver Stadium for the first time since 2006; it had lost the previous three times when traveling to Penn State. Michigan also became the first team this season to defeat Penn State at home. Jake Rudock became the first quarterback in Michigan history to throw for at least 250 yards in three consecutive games. Michigan's offensive line held Penn State to only two sacks. The Nittany Lions came into the game having the most sacks in Division I FBS and had averaged 4.2 sacks per game. Michigan has allowed the opposition only 25 red-zone chances, the fewest in FBS. Jourdan Lewis added to his Michigan single-season record with one more pass breakup, giving him 21 on the year. With the win, Michigan completed its first perfect Big Ten road season since 1997.

vs. Ohio State

Sources:

    
    
    
    
    
    
    
    

Following its road finale against Penn State, Michigan faced its arch-rivals, the Ohio State Buckeyes, in the 112th meeting of "The Game." Ohio State won the previous meeting by a score of 42–28. Prior to the game, Michigan retired six numbers that were previously a part of the "Michigan Legends" program. The numbers were 11 (worn by the Wistert Brothers—Al Wistert, Alvin Wistert, and Whitey Wistert), 21 (worn by Desmond Howard), 47 (worn by Bennie Oosterbaan), 48 (worn by Gerald Ford), 87 (worn by Ron Kramer), and 98 (worn by Tom Harmon). Howard's Number 21 jersey will officially be retired, as his was the only jersey of the six that was not formally retired at Michigan prior to the implementation of the legends program.

Ohio State defeated Michigan, 42–13. Ohio State opened the scoring in the first quarter with a seven-yard touchdown run from J. T. Barrett, but Michigan responded with a 25-yard field goal by Kenny Allen. Ohio State extended its lead in the second quarter via a five-yard touchdown run from Ezekiel Elliott. Michigan responded with a five-yard touchdown pass from Jake Rudock to Jehu Chesson, making the score 14–10 in favor of Ohio State at half-time. Ohio State responded with 14 unanswered points in the third quarter, via a 25-yard touchdown pass from Barrett to Jalin Marshall, and a 13-yard touchdown run from Barrett. Michigan responded in the fourth quarter with a 27-yard field goal by Allen. Ohio State added to its lead in the fourth quarter with 14 unanswered points via a 10-yard touchdown run from Elliott and a 17-yard touchdown run from Barrett.

Jake Rudock became the first quarterback in Michigan history to throw for at least 250 yards in four consecutive games. With 2,739 passing yards this season, Rudock moved to fifth place among Michigan's all-time single-season leaders. With 620 receiving yards this season, Jake Butt moved to third place among Michigan's all-time single-season leaders in receiving yards by a tight end. The announced attendance of 111,829 marked the 265th consecutive game of more than 100,000 fans in attendance, and was the largest crowd of 2015.

vs. Florida

Sources:

    
    
    
    
    
    
    

On December 6, Michigan was selected to play in the Citrus Bowl against the Florida Gators. Michigan won the previous meeting, in the 2008 Capital One Bowl, by a score of 41–35. This was Michigan's 44th bowl game appearance, and fifth appearance in the Citrus Bowl.

Michigan dominated Florida, winning 41–7. Michigan opened the scoring in the first quarter with a four-yard touchdown run from Drake Johnson. Florida responded with a two-yard touchdown pass from Antonio Callaway to Treon Harris, but that would be its only score of the game, as Michigan responded with 34 unanswered points. Michigan regained the lead in the second quarter with a 31-yard touchdown pass from Jake Rudock to Jehu Chesson, and then added a 21-yard field goal from Kenny Allen, making the score 17–7 in favor of Michigan at half-time. Michigan added to its lead in the third quarter via a three-yard touchdown pass from Rudock to Grant Perry and a two-yard touchdown run from Sione Houma, making the score 31–7 after three quarters. Michigan added ten more points in the fourth quarter via an eight-yard touchdown pass from Rudock to Johnson, before Allen added the final points of the game via a 25-yard field goal.

Rudock was named the game MVP, as voted by the media. Jake Rudock became the first quarterback in Michigan history to throw for at least 250 yards in five consecutive games. Rudock completed 20-of-31 passes for 278 yards and three touchdowns, becoming just the second Michigan quarterback to throw for 3,000 yards in a single season, following John Navarre in 2003. Rudock finished his season ranked No. 2 in single-season passing yards (3,017) and No. 1 in single-season completion percentage (64 percent). With three receptions for 34 yards, tight end Jake Butt finishes the season ranked No. 2 in single-season receptions (51) by a Michigan tight end and No. 3 in receiving yards by a tight end (654). Michigan's 41 points marked the most that Florida had allowed this season. The win marked Michigan's second-largest scoring margin in a bowl game since the 1948 Rose Bowl (49–0 win over USC). The largest since that game came in a 42–7 win over NC State in the 1994 Hall of Fame Bowl. The attendance of 63,113 was the highest Citrus Bowl attendance figure since the 2008 Capital One Bowl, also between Michigan and Florida.

2016 NFL Draft

Three Wolverines were drafted in the 2016 NFL Draft.

Roster

Awards and honors

References

External links

Michigan
Michigan Wolverines football seasons
Citrus Bowl champion seasons
Michigan Wolverines football